James Edward Bostic (born March 13, 1972) is a former American football running back, played football at Auburn University, in the NFL for the Philadelphia Eagles, and the defunct XFL.

Bostic played college football at Auburn University. During the 1993 season, he was the leading running back in the Southeastern Conference.

In 1993 James led the Southeastern Conference with 1,205 yards in 199 attempts in 11 games. He averaged 6.1 YPC, scored 12 touchdown's, and averaged 109.6 YDSPG.

He was drafted in the third round of the 1994 NFL Draft by the Los Angeles Rams, but never played for the team. Bostic was briefly signed to the practice squad of the Miami Dolphins but was waived on September 30, 1998. Bostic eventually signed with the Philadelphia Eagles for the 1998 and 1999 seasons. He appeared in 11 total games for Philadelphia, with five rushing attempts for 19 yards and five receptions for eight yards, all in the 1999 season.

In 2001, Bostic was the starting running back for the XFL's Birmingham Thunderbolts. He led the XFL in rushing attempts that year with 153, and was third in rushing yards with 536. 

In 2004, Bostic had a tryout for the NFL's Miami Dolphins. Bostic retired from professional football shortly after.

He lives in Coral Springs, Florida, where he serves as a police officer.

References

External links
Sports Illustrated player profile
James Bostic NFL statistics
Against All Odds: Bostic recalls ’93

Living people
1972 births
American football running backs
Auburn Tigers football players
Philadelphia Eagles players
Birmingham Thunderbolts players